Susan Jolliffe Napier (born October 11, 1955) is a Professor of the Japanese Program at Tufts University. She was formerly the Mitsubishi Professor of Japanese Literature and Culture at the University of Texas at Austin. She also worked as a visiting professor in the Department of East Asian Languages and Civilizations at Harvard University, and in cinema and media studies at University of Pennsylvania. Napier is an anime and manga critic.

Biography
Napier is the daughter of historian Reginald Phelps, a historian and educational administrator, and Julia Sears Phelps, both Harvard academics. She was raised in Cambridge, Massachusetts.  Her neighbors included John Kenneth Galbraith, Julia Child, and Arthur Schlesinger Jr. She obtained her A.B., A.M., and PhD degrees from Harvard University.

In 1991 Napier published Escape from the Wasteland: Romanticism and Realism in the Fiction of Mishima Yukio and Oe Kenzaburo. Her second book, The Fantastic in Modern Japanese Literature: The Subversion of Modernity, followed in 1996.

Napier first became interested in anime and manga when a student showed her a copy of Akira.  Napier then saw the film, which led to the creation of her third book, Anime from Akira to Princess Mononoke: Experiencing Contemporary Japanese Animation, which was revised in 2005. Napier's From Impressionism To Anime: Japan As Fantasy And Fan Cult In The Western Imagination was published in 2007, which discusses anime fandom in greater depth.

Works

References

External links
Tufts Faculty guide 

Napier's review of Princess Mononoke at Nausicaa.net
Palgrave Macmillan author profile

Living people
Anime and manga critics
University of Texas at Austin faculty
Harvard University faculty
Tufts University faculty
1955 births
Harvard University alumni
American women academics
American Japanologists
Japanese literature academics
21st-century American women